Internal media of China enables high-level Chinese Communist Party (CCP) cadres to access information that is subject of censorship in China for the general public.

As He Qinglian documents in chapter 4 of Media Control in China,<ref>He Qinglian: [http://www.hrichina.org/sites/default/files/PDFs/Reports/HRIC-Fog-of-Censorship.pdf THE FOG OF CENSORSHIP - MEDIA CONTROL IN CHINA],  published in Chinese in 2004 by Human Rights in China, New York. Revised edition 2006 published by Liming Cultural Enterprises of Taiwan. Retrieved August 7, 2016.</ref> there are many grades and types of internal documents. Many are restricted to a certain administrative level – such as county level, provincial level or down to certain official levels in a ministry. Some Chinese journalists, including Xinhua correspondents in foreign countries, write for both the mass media and the internal media.

Since Xi Jinping became CCP general secretary, internal reports have been increasingly subject to censorship previously reserved only for public media.

 Types of documents 

 Formal Documents (正式文件; zhèngshì wénjiàn) are written and issued by leading organizations of the Chinese Communist Party (CCP) and government. These instructions (指示; zhǐshì), regulations (规定; guīdìng) and notices (通知; tōngzhī) are binding on lower level units. The most important formal documents are CCP Central Committee documents (中共中央文件; zhōnggòng zhōngyāng wénjiàn).
 Status Reports (动态简报; dòngtài jiǎnbào) are written and issued by the CCP, the government and the military. Leading departments provide comprehensive reports to higher levels and bulletins to guide the work of lower level units. In news organizations, the most important is the monthly evaluation titled Situation Report (情况通报; qíngkuàng tōngbào). The Situation Report lists incidents in which Chinese media violated guidelines and the penalties imposed in each instance. The Report is an essential management tool of the Propaganda Department of the Chinese Communist Party for controlling news media, so that the various Chinese media do not violate propaganda discipline or as the propaganda department puts it "self-discipline".
 Reference Materials (参考资料; cānkǎo zīliào) are edited and published by larger news units such as CCP newspapers or government newspapers. According to news discipline, any matter that the media outlets believe would harm the image of the CCP or government, threaten social stability and unity, or other matters not suitable for open publications such as corruption, social unrest, and larger business swindles are often reported internally rather than in the mass media. Many well-done reports by conscientious journalists are placed in internal channels rather than in the mass media. These "internal materials" are often printed in only a few dozen copies for distribution to leaders and certain organizations. The most authoritative are the three types of internal references edited by the Xinhua News Agency.

The PRC State Secrecy Protection Law (保守国家秘密法; bǎoshǒu guójiā mìmì fǎ) Section Nine stipulates three grades of state secrets: top secret (绝密; juémì), secret (机密; jīmì) and confidential (秘密; mìmì) as well as a fourth grade of information, internal materials (内部资料; nèibù zīliào) that may be read by Chinese citizens only. The Chinese State Secrecy Protection Law Implementing Regulations (国家秘密法实施办法; guójiā mìmì fǎ shíshī bànfǎ) section two defines these grades of secrecy and the permissions allowed to government departments at each level. In each Chinese administrative region, Party organizations such as committees and disciplinary committees, government organizations such as people's congresses, governments, and consultative congresses, and military organizations such as military districts and their provincial military districts, and the hundreds of agencies subordinate to them issue these three types of internal documents.

The level of classification is tied to the administrative levels of the CCP and the government in China. The higher the administrative level of the issuing office, the more secret the document. In local governments the issuing grades are province (省; shěng), region (or city directly subordinate to a province) (地区; dìqū or, respectively 省直辖市; shěngzhíxiáshì) and county (县; xiàn). Grades within government organs are ministry (部; bù), bureau (局; jú) and office (处; chù). Grades in the military are corps (军; jūn), division (师; shī), and regiment (团; tuán). The most authoritative documents are drafted by the Central Committee to convey instructions from CCP leaders.  Documents with "Chinese Communist Party Central Committee Document" (中共中央文件; zhōnggòng zhōngyāng wénjiàn) written at the top in red letters are the most authoritative.

 Internal news publications 

There are four types of publications in this category. The first three types are internal news, edited and distributed within the Chinese news control system by the Second Editorial Office of the Domestic News Department of the Xinhua News Agency and by the Chief Editor's Office of the People's Daily. The fourth type of publication is devoted to policy suggestions and reports to relatively low level officials:

 Domestic Developments (国内动态; guónèi dòngtài) edited by Xinhua News Agency once or twice daily to report on important domestic events and important proposals at the high level of the CCP.  Generally called Big Reference (大参考; dà cānkǎo), it is 2 to 6 pages long and distributed to the central committee leaders, officials of ministerial rank, and to provincial governors and Party secretaries. This top secret document must be returned after being read; those who lose it assume political responsibility. Although unlikely and forbidden by authorities, some of the content might be leaked overseas by word of mouth. Domestic Developments is a bulletin for the leaders that includes detailed analysis of matters, such as certain social disturbances, that will not be reported in the mass media, or at least not at a level as detailed as what is reported in the Domestic Developments.
 Internal Reference (内部参考; nèibù cānkǎo) edited by the Xinhua News Agency twice weekly, it has 40 to 60 pages to report major domestic developments and statements.  This secret document is circulated as far down as the regional and divisional levels and is the only formal channel to provide domestic classified information to medium and higher ranking Party members.
 Internal Reference Selections (内部选编; nèibù xuǎnbiān) edited by the Xinhua News Agency weekly with 30 to 40 pages. It provides confidential level information to grassroots cadres down to the district and township leader level as well as to officials at the higher county and regimental level. After the mid-1990s very few true confidential matters appeared in it and it was no longer collected after reading. Readership was extended to the deputy office director level.
 Internal Readings (内部参阅; nèibù cānyuè) edited by the People's Daily. Internal Readings is a secret level news document that contains policy suggestions and some survey reports of sensitive matters such as corruption in the government and studies on problems of village governments. From the mid-1990s cadres at the vice office director level have been allowed to subscribe privately to Internal Readings.

The news monopoly has enabled the CCP to filter the news, although this has become more difficult since the Internet arose in the 1990s. Security has weakened and many units no longer collect Internal Reference Selections or Internal Readings''. However private citizens are not allowed to hold secret or above classified material and some people have been prosecuted for that offense. The scope of state secrets can be expanded at the CCP's convenience. In some cases, He Qinglian writes, formerly open materials have become classified.  After the 1989 Tiananmen Square protests and massacre, for the sake of protecting China's image, many documents issued by the Propaganda Department of the CCP to guide the media have been classified at the top secret or secret levels or have been passed orally.

Censorship 
Since CCP general secretary Xi Jinping has consolidated power, internal-only reports have been subject to censorship previously applied only to media for the general public.

See also
Neican
Dibao

References

Mass media in China
Politics of China
Censorship in China
Government of China
Chinese Communist Party